Paolo Lanfranchi (born July 25, 1968 in Gazzaniga, Province of Bergamo) is an Italian former professional road bicycle racer. Originally from Gazzaniga, Italy. Lanfranchi was a dominating figure in the Italian road racing scene by winning many points standings. Turning pro in 1993, he captured his first major victory in winning a Yellow Jersey for General classification of the Tour de Langkawi in 1999 riding for the  team, and again in 2001 with the same team.

Major results 

1988
 1st GP Capodarco
1990
 1st Giro del Medio Brenta
1991
 1st Gran Premio di Poggiana
1992
 3rd Trofeo Città di San Vendemiano
1994
 3rd Clásica Internacional de Alcobendas
1995
 2nd Road race, National Road Championships
 2nd Trofeo Matteotti
 4th GP Città di Camaiore
1996
 3rd GP Llodio
1997
 2nd Giro di Lombardia
 2nd Giro del Piemonte
 3rd Milano–Torino
1998
 2nd Giro dell'Appennino
1999
 1st  Overall Tour de Langkawi
 1st  Overall GP Internacional Telecom
1st Stage 1
 4th GP Città di Camaiore
 4th Tre Valli Varesine
2000
 1st Stage 19 Giro d'Italia
 3rd Giro dell'Appennino
 3rd LuK Challenge
 3rd Clasica de Sabiñanigo
2001
 1st  Overall Tour de Langkawi
1st Prologue, Stages 8 & 9
 3rd GP Miguel Indurain
 4th Giro dell'Emilia
 6th Giro del Lazio
 6th GP Industria & Commercio di Prato
 9th Giro di Romagna
 9th Overall Vuelta a Murcia
 10th GP Industria & Artigianato di Larciano
2002
 3rd GP Kanton Aargau Gippingen
 8th Overall Tour de Langkawi
2003
 5th Overall Tour Down Under
 5th Overall Giro del Trentino
 6th Coppa Sabatini
 6th GP Industria & Commercio di Prato
 8th Tre Valli Varesine
 10th Overall Tour de Langkawi
2004
 9th Coppa Agostoni

Grand Tour general classification results timeline

References

External links
 
 
 
 

1968 births
Living people
Cyclists from the Province of Bergamo
Italian male cyclists
People from Gazzaniga